Shovelware is a term for individual video games or software bundles known more for the quantity of what is included than for the quality or usefulness.

The metaphor implies that the creators showed little care for the quality of the original software, as if the new compilation or version had been created by indiscriminately adding titles "by the shovel" in the same way someone would shovel bulk material into a pile. The term "shovelware" is coined by semantic analogy to phrases like shareware and freeware, which describe methods of software distribution.  It first appeared in the early 1990s when large amounts of shareware demo programs were copied onto CD-ROMs and advertised in magazines or sold at computer flea markets.

Shovelware CD-ROMs
Computer Gaming World wrote in 1990 that for "those who do not wish to wait for "software that used the new CD-ROM format, The Software Toolworks and Access Software planned to release "game packs of several classic titles". By 1993 the magazine referred to software repackaged on CD-ROM as "shovelware", describing one collection from Access as having a "rather dusty menu" and another from The Software Toolworks ("the reigning king of software repackaging efforts") as including games that were "mostly mediocre even in their prime"; the one exception, Chessmaster 2000, used "stunning CGA graphics". In 1994 the magazine described shovelware as "old and/or weak programs shoveled onto a CD to turn a quick buck".

Although poor-quality collections existed at least as far back as the BBS era, the term "shovelware" became commonly used in the early 1990s to describe CD-ROMs with collections of shareware or public domain software. The capacity of CD-ROM was 450–700 times that of the floppy disk, and 6–16 times larger than the hard disks commonly fitted to personal computers in 1990. This outsized capacity meant that very few users would install the disc's entire contents, encouraging producers to fill them by including as much existing content as possible, often without regard to the quality of the material. Advertising the number of titles on the disc often took precedence over the quality of the content. Software reviewers, displeased with huge collections of inconsistent quality, dubbed this practice "shovelware". Some CD-ROM computer games had moderately sized games that did not fill the disc, which enabled game companies to bundle demo versions of other products on the same disc.

The prevalence of shovelware has decreased due to the practice of downloading individual programs from a crowdsourced or curated app store becoming the predominant mode of software distribution. It continues in some cases with bundled or pre-installed software, where many extra programs of dubious quality and functionality are included with a piece of hardware.

Shovelware video games

Low-budget, poor-quality video games, released in the hopes of being purchased by unsuspecting customers, are often referred to as "shovelware". This can lead to discoverability issues when a platform has no type of quality control. Several well-known examples were released for the Wii, including ports of PlayStation 2 games which had previously only been released in Europe.

Video games such as Ninjabread Man, Anubis II, Myth Makers: Trixie in Toyland, and Rock 'n' Roll Adventures, designed by Data Design Interactive have gained infamy for using the exact same gameplay, just with different level designs and textures. Shovelware video games often have a negative reception from critics and gamers. 

Blast! Entertainment Ltd., a defunct video game developer and publisher, are known for releasing licensed shovelware games based on movies, television shows and books such as An American Tail, Beverly Hills Cop, Casper and the Ghostly Trio, Jumanji, and Lassie to name a few which would all receive negative reception among their respective fans and critics.

Phoenix Games, a former European publisher, is known for its line of value priced titles for the Playstation 2, Wii, DS, and PC many of which are poorly based on popular properties and offer very little in terms of actual gameplay. Instead, they've been reviewed by numerous gamers and critics as cheaply made short animated films.

Asset flips are a type of shovelware that largely or entirely use pre-made assets in order to release games en masse. Called "fake" games by Valve Corporation, 173 were removed from Steam in one 2017 purge that included several sock puppets of Silicon Echo Studios.

See also
 Freeware
 Pre-installed software
 Product bundling
 Software bloat
 Unwanted software bundling
 Video game crash of 1983

References

External links
 Archive of CD-ROM compilations at Textfiles.com
 Alistair B. Fraser on Academic Shovelware
 Wired: On Wii Shovelware
 PC World: Make your new PC hassle free

Software distribution
Bundled products or services
Computer jargon
Criticisms of software and websites